Nikos Sarganis (Greek: Νίκος Σαργκάνης; born 13 January 1954) is a Greek former professional footballer who played as a goalkeeper.

Career
Born in Rafina, Attica, Sarganis started his football career as a fullback at Ilisiakos. He switched to goalkeeper under the guidance of his coach, Christos Rimbas, himself a capable goalkeeper of the 1930s.

Sarganis moved on to Kastoria FC in 1977 and played for the "furriers" until the end of the 1980 season. He was part of the team that shocked the Greek football world by winning the Greek Cup in 1980. Following that triumph, he transferred to Olympiakos where he would play from 1980 until the end of the 1985 season.

Sarganis then controversially joined Olympiakos' arch-rivals, Panathinaikos and played for the greens for the next five years. He continued his career with Athinaikos (1991 and 1992 seasons).

During his career Sarganis was capped 58 times by the Greece national football team. His international high point came on 15 October 1980, when he preserved a 1–0 Greek victory in Copenhagen against Denmark. The Danish press gave him the nickname "Phantom" by which he would be known throughout the rest of his career.

On 8 May 1988, Sarganis helped win the Greek Cup for Panathinaikos in a penalty shootout by saving two Olympiakos penalty shots while scoring one himself.

Sarganis is an active member of Olympiakos Old Players team.

Honours

Club
Kastoria
Greek Cup: 1979–80

Olympiacos
Greek Championship: 1980–81, 1981–82, 1982– 83
Greek Cup: 1980–81

Panathinaikos
Greek Championship: 1985–86, 1989–90
Greek Cup: 1985–86, 1987–88, 1988–89

References

External links

1954 births
Living people
Association football goalkeepers
Greek footballers
Greece international footballers
Panathinaikos F.C. players
Ilisiakos F.C. players
Olympiacos F.C. players
Athinaikos F.C. players
Kastoria F.C. players
People from East Attica
Footballers from Attica